Abbé Huard River is a river in the Côte-Nord region of the province of Quebec, Canada. It is a tributary of the Romaine River.
The lower part of the river, where it meandered through sand and gravel deposits, has been flooded by the Romaine-2 reservoir.

Location

The Abbé-Huard River, a tributary of the Romaine River, originates in Abbé Huard Lake.
The lake is in the unorganized territory of Lac-Jérôme in the Minganie Regional County Municipality.
The river is the second northeast branch of the Romaine River.
The mouth of the river, where it meets the Romaine River, is also in Lac-Jérôme.
Before the river was flooded, the Abbé-Huard entered the Romaine at PK 131.

Name

Abbé Huard Lake is named after the abbé Victor-Alphonse Huard (1853–1929), a naturalist and a professor at the Chicoutimi Seminary.
He visited the region between Pessamit and Natashquan in 1895, and described the trip in his Labrador et Anticosti (1897).
In his Dictionary of Rivers and Lakes of the Province of Quebec (1914), Eugène Rouillard points out the lake was probably named after the Abbé Huard before the river.
The Innu call the river Uauiekamau Hipu, or "Round Lake River".
The Naskapi call the river Umuauk Shipu or "Loon River", a literal translation of the French Rivière Huard.

Basin

The river flows along the contact zone between rocks of the Anorthositic Suite of Havre-Saint-Pierre to the north, and deformed rocks to the south.
A map of the ecological regions of Quebec shows the river on the border between sub-regions 6j-S and 6n-T of the east spruce/moss subdomain.

Flooded section

The lower part of the Abbé-Huard River now forms the northeast arm of the Romaine-2 reservoir.
Before the Romaine-2 reservoir was flooded, the mouth of the river flowed between terraces of sand and gravel.
About  of the river's banks were subject to active erosion, mostly on the concave shores.
There was a well-developed delta at the river mouth.
The flooded section was thought to have high archaeological potential, but a survey found no sites.

Notes

Sources

See also
Lac-Jérôme, an unorganized territory
Romaine River
List of rivers of Quebec

Rivers of Côte-Nord